The United States House of Representatives election in the Northern Mariana Islands, 2008 took place on November 4, 2008 and was the Northern Mariana Islands' first election of a delegate to the United States House of Representatives. Since the CNMI traditionally had general elections in odd-numbered years, the November 2008 ballot contained only this office.

The Commonwealth of the Northern Mariana Islands was the most recent United States jurisdiction to receive congressional representation in the United States House of Representatives (in the form of a non-voting delegate).

Gregorio Sablan, who ran as an independent, won the election and became the first Northern Mariana Islands Delegate in Congressional history. He assumed office in January 2009.

Election background 
The Consolidated Natural Resources Act of 2008 allowed the Northern Mariana Islands to elect its first Delegate in history to the United States House of Representatives and created a new Northern Mariana Islands' At-large congressional district.

Under the 2008 law, the new CNMI delegate was allowed to serve in United States Congressional committees within the House of Representatives and vote on proposed legislation on the committee level. However, as with the delegates from other U.S. territories, the CNMI delegate received limited powers, not being permitted to vote on full legislation on the United States House floor. The new delegate received all of the same allowances, benefits and compensation, including an approximately $170,000 a year salary, as a full member of the House of Representatives.

The new legislation also federalized the islands' immigration and labor controls and policies. The new provisions for United States government control over CNMI immigration policy were opposed by Governor Benigno Fitial, who filed a lawsuit in September 2008 in the U.S. District Court for the District of Columbia to halt the takeover. Fitial's suit contended that the immigration takeover by U.S. federal authorities, scheduled for mid-2009, would harm the economy of the Northern Mariana Islands by limiting the number of foreign aliens allowed to work in the territory. The leadership of the Northern Mariana Islands Senate opposed Fitial's lawsuit against the United States government and voted to deny a requested $400,000 in funding for the legal action.

Though legal action was still pending at the time of the election, Governor Benigno Fitial encouraged all registered CNMI voters to cast their ballots for the new delegate on election day.

The deadline for prospective candidates to file to run in the election was August 6, 2008.

The historic first federal election did not attract much attention, in terms of overall voter registration.  Less than 13,000 people registered to vote in the lone Congressional election. These voters represented 1/4 of the total CNMI population. This represented a 15 percent drop in the number of registered voters from the 2007 midterm legislative elections.

Candidates 
Listed alphabetically by political party

To be eligible to run in the 2008 Congressional election, each candidate was required to be a United States citizen, at least 25 years of age, and must have resided in the Northern Mariana Islands for at least seven years before the election. Candidates were also required to be registered CNMI voters on the day of the election (November 4, 2008) and could not seek any other elected office simultaneously.

The field of nine candidates for the Congressional election consisted of one Republican, one Democrat and seven independents. The nine candidates represented a very diverse mix of professional backgrounds.

Democratic Party (endorsed candidate)
David Cing, former Northern Mariana Islands Senator

Independent candidates 
Felipe Atalig, Saipan and Northern Islands Municipal Council member, a Republican, but running as an independent
Luis Crisostimo, Northern Mariana Islands Senator, a Democrat, but running as an independent
John Davis, high school teacher and Vietnam War veteran
John Gonzales, television talk show host, a Covenant Party member, but running as an independent
Juan T. Lizama, retired judge, a Republican, but running as an independent
Gregorio C. Sablan, former Election Commission executive director, a Democrat, but running as an independent
Chong Won, businessman originally from South Korea, first time political candidate

Republican Party (endorsed candidate) 
Pete Tenorio, current elected resident representative in Washington D.C. since 2002.

Results

References

External links 
Pacific Magazine: Sablan's Lead Expected To Hold In U.S. Congress Race
Saipan Tribune: Election Primer: Who, what, where when of historic delegate polls
Saipan Tribune: Candidates quizzed at public forum
Forum puts delegate contenders in hot seat

United States House of Representatives
Northern Mariana Islands
2008